The 1989 NCAA Division I baseball season, play of college baseball in the United States organized by the National Collegiate Athletic Association (NCAA) began in the spring of 1989.  The season progressed through the regular season and concluded with the 1989 College World Series.  The College World Series, held for the forty third time in 1989, consisted of one team from each of eight regional competitions and was held in Omaha, Nebraska, at Johnny Rosenblatt Stadium as a double-elimination tournament.  Wichita State claimed the championship for the first time.

Realignment and format changes
Davidson left the Southern Conference to compete as an Independent.  They would return to the SoCon in 1993.
With Davidson's departure, the became a seven team league, and dissolved its divisional format.

Conference winners
This is a partial list of conference champions from the 1989 season.  The NCAA sponsored regional competitions to determine the College World Series participants.  Each of the eight regionals consisted of six teams competing in double-elimination tournaments, with the winners advancing to Omaha.  27 teams earned automatic bids by winning their conference championship while 21 teams earned at-large selections.

Conference standings
The following is an incomplete list of conference standings:

College World Series

The 1989 season marked the forty third NCAA Baseball Tournament, which culminated with the eight team College World Series.  The College World Series was held in Omaha, Nebraska.  The eight teams played a double-elimination format, with Wichita State claiming their first championship with a 5–3 win over Texas in the final.

Award winners

All-America team

References